Kinnabulla is a locality located in the local government area of the Shire of Buloke, Victoria, Australia. The population of the locality is 173 people, 91 being male, and 82 being female. Kinnabulla Railway Station was a station on the Mildura railway line. The station closed to passenger and parcels traffic on 11 November 1975. The post office there opened in 1902 and was closed on 11 November 1973.

References